Kandi Airport  is a public use airport located near Kandi, Alibori, Benin.

References

External links 
 Airport record for Kandi Airport at Landings.com

Airports in Benin
Alibori Department